Giannis Valaoras (born 23 May 1958) is a Greek former footballer who played as a forward during the 1980s and early 1990s. He played for Larissa and Trikala F.C. He captained the team on various occasions, and celebrated both the Greek Championship and the Greek Cup during his time at Larissa. Today, he remains a fan favorite.

Valaoras also made 4 appearances for the Greece national football team.

Honours
Larissa
 Greek Cup: 1985
 Greek Championship: 1988

References 

1958 births
Living people
Footballers from Larissa
Greek footballers
Greece international footballers
Athlitiki Enosi Larissa F.C. players
Trikala F.C. players
Anthoupoli Larissa F.C. players
Association football midfielders